, is one of the oldest Japanese crafts and art forms, dating back to the Neolithic period. Kilns have produced earthenware, pottery, stoneware, glazed pottery, glazed stoneware, porcelain, and blue-and-white ware. Japan has an exceptionally long and successful history of ceramic production.  Earthenwares were made as early as the Jōmon period (10,500–300BC), giving Japan one of the oldest ceramic traditions in the world. Japan is further distinguished by the unusual esteem that ceramics holds within its artistic tradition, owing to the enduring popularity of the tea ceremony.

Japanese ceramic history records distinguished many potter names, and some were artist-potters, e.g. Hon'ami Kōetsu, Ogata Kenzan, and Aoki Mokubei. Japanese anagama kilns also have flourished through the ages, and their influence weighs with that of the potters. Another characteristically Japanese aspect of the art is the continuing popularity of unglazed high-fired stoneware even after porcelain became popular. Since the 4th century, Japanese ceramics have often been influenced by Chinese and Korean pottery. Japan transformed and translated the Chinese and Korean prototypes into a uniquely Japanese creation, and the result was distinctly Japanese in character. Since the mid-17th century when Japan started to industrialize, high-quality standard wares produced in factories became popular exports to Europe. In the 20th century, a modern ceramics industry (e.g., Noritake and Toto Ltd.) grew up.

Japanese pottery is distinguished by two polarised aesthetic traditions. On the one hand, there is a tradition of very simple and roughly finished pottery, mostly in earthenware and using a muted palette of earth colours. This relates to Zen Buddhism and many of the greatest masters were priests, especially in early periods. Most raku ware, where the final decoration is partly random, is in this tradition. The other tradition is of highly finished and brightly coloured factory wares, mostly in porcelain, with complex and balanced decoration, which develops Chinese porcelain styles in a distinct way. A third tradition, of simple but perfectly formed and glazed stonewares, also relates more closely to both Chinese and Korean traditions. In the 16th century, a number of styles of traditional utilitarian rustic wares then in production became admired for their simplicity, and their forms have often been kept in production to the present day for a collectors market.

History

Jōmon period 

In the Neolithic period ( millenniumBC), the earliest soft earthenware was made.

During the early Jōmon period in the 6th millenniumBC typical coil-made ware appeared, decorated with hand-impressed rope patterns. Jōmon pottery developed a flamboyant style at its height and was simplified in the later Jōmon period. The pottery was formed by coiling clay ropes and fired in an open fire.

Yayoi period 
In about the 4th–3rd centuriesBC Yayoi period, Yayoi pottery appeared which was another style of earthenware characterised by a simple pattern or no pattern. Jōmon, Yayoi, and later Haji ware shared the firing process but had different styles of design.

Kofun period 

In the 3rd to 4th centuriesAD, the anagama kiln, a roofed-tunnel kiln on a hillside, and the potter's wheel appeared, brought to Kyushu island from the Korean peninsula.

Its manufacture began in the 5th century and continued in outlying areas until the 14th century. Although several regional variations have been identified, Sue was remarkably homogeneous throughout Japan. The function of Sue pottery, however, changed over time: during the Kofun period (AD300–710) it was primarily funerary ware; during the Nara period (710–94) and the Heian period (794–1185), it became an elite tableware; and finally it was used as a utilitarian ware and for the ritual vessels for Buddhist altars.

Contemporary Haji ware and  funerary objects were earthenware like Yayoi.

Heian period 

Although a three-color lead glaze technique was introduced to Japan from the Tang dynasty of China in the 8th century, official kilns produced only simple green lead glaze for temples in the Heian period, around 800–1200.

Kamui ware appeared in this time, as well as Atsumi ware and Tokoname ware.

Kamakura period 
Until the 17th century, unglazed stoneware was popular for the heavy-duty daily requirements of a largely agrarian society; funerary jars, storage jars, and a variety of kitchen pots typify the bulk of the production. Some of the kilns improved their technology and are called the "Six Old Kilns": Shigaraki (Shigaraki ware), Tamba, Bizen, Tokoname, Echizen, and Seto.

Among these, the Seto kiln in Owari Province (present day Aichi Prefecture) had a glaze technique. According to legend, Katō Shirozaemon Kagemasa (also known as Tōshirō) studied ceramic techniques in China and brought high-fired glazed ceramic to Seto in 1223. The Seto kiln primarily imitated Chinese ceramics as a substitute for the Chinese product. It developed various glazes: ash brown, iron black, feldspar white, and copper green. The wares were so widely used that  became the generic term for ceramics in Japan. Seto kiln also produced unglazed stoneware. In the late 16th century, many Seto potters fleeing the civil wars moved to Mino Province in the Gifu Prefecture, where they produced glazed pottery: , Shino, and Oribe ware.

Muromachi period 

According to chronicles in 1406, the Yongle Emperor (1360–1424) of the Ming dynasty bestowed ten Jian ware bowls from the Song dynasty to the  Ashikaga Yoshimitsu (1358–1408), who ruled during the Muromachi period. A number of Japanese monks who traveled to monasteries in China also brought pieces back home. As they became valued for tea ceremonies, more pieces were imported from China where they became highly prized goods. Five of these vessels from the southern Song dynasty are so highly valued that they were included by the government in the list of National Treasures of Japan (crafts: others).

Azuchi-Momoyama period 
From the middle of the 11th century to the 16th century, Japan imported much Chinese celadon greenware, white porcelain, and blue-and-white ware. Japan also imported Chinese pottery as well as Korean and Vietnamese ceramics. Such  were regarded as sophisticated items, which the upper classes used in the tea ceremony. The Japanese also ordered custom-designed ceramics from Chinese kilns.

Sengoku period 

With the rise of Buddhism in the late 16th century, leading tea masters introduced a change of style and favored humble Korean tea bowls and domestic ware over sophisticated Chinese porcelain. The influential tea master Sen no Rikyū (1522–1591) turned to native Japanese styles of simple rustic pottery, often imperfect, which he admired for their "rugged spontaneity", a "decisive shift" of enormous importance for the development of Japanese pottery. The Raku family (named after the pottery rather than the other way round) supplied brown-glazed earthenware tea bowls. Mino, Bizen, Shigaraki (Shigaraki ware), Iga (similar to Shigaraki), and other domestic kilns also supplied tea utensils. The artist-potter Hon'ami Kōetsu made several tea bowls now considered masterpieces.

During Toyotomi Hideyoshi's 1592 invasion of Korea, Japanese forces brought Korean potters as slaves to Japan, although there is also evidence of earlier voluntary immigration. According to tradition, one of the kidnapped, Yi Sam-pyeong, discovered a source of porcelain clay near Arita and was able to produce the first Japanese porcelain. Soon the Satsuma, Hagi, Karatsu, Takatori, Agano and Arita kilns were begun.

Edo period 

In the 1640s, rebellions in China and wars between the Ming dynasty and the Manchus damaged many kilns, and in 1656–1684 the new Qing dynasty government stopped trade by closing its ports. Chinese potter refugees were able to introduce refined porcelain techniques and enamel glazes to the Arita kilns. From 1658, the Dutch East India Company looked to Japan for blue-and-white porcelain to sell in Europe (see Imari porcelain). At that time, the Arita kilns like the Kakiemon kiln could not yet supply enough quality porcelain to the Dutch East India Company, but they quickly expanded their capacity. From 1659 to 1740, the Arita kilns were able to export enormous quantities of porcelain to Europe and Asia. Gradually the Chinese kilns recovered, and developed their own styles of the highly coloured enamelled wares that Europeans found so attractive, including famille rose, famille verte and the rest of that group. From about 1720 Chinese and European kilns also began to imitate the Imari enamelled style at the lower end of the market, and by about 1740 the first period of Japanese export porcelain had all but ceased. The Arita kilns also supplied domestic utensils such as the so-called Ko-Kutani enamelware.

Porcelain was also exported to China, much of which was resold by Chinese merchants to the other European "East Indies Companies" which were not allowed to trade in Japan itself. It has been suggested that the choice of such items was mainly dictated by Chinese taste, which preferred Kakiemon to "Imari" wares, accounting for a conspicuous disparity in early European collections that can be reconstructed between Dutch ones and those of other countries, such as England, France and Germany. Because Imari was the shipping port, some porcelain, for both export and domestic use, was called . The European custom has generally been to call blue and white wares "Arita" and blue, red and gold ones "Imari", though in fact both were often made in the same kilns arong Arita. In 1759 the dark red enamel pigment known as  became industrially available, leading to a reddish revival of the orange 1720  style.

In 1675, the local Nabeshima family who ruled Arita established a personal kiln to make top-quality enamelware porcelain for the upper classes in Japan, which is called Nabeshima ware. This uses mainly decoration in traditional Japanese styles, often drawing from textiles, rather than the Chinese-derived styles of most Arita ware. Hirado ware was another kind of porcelain initially reserved for presentation as political gifts among the elite, concentrating on very fine painting in blue on an unusually fine white body, for which scroll painters were hired.  These two types represented the finest porcelain produced after the export trade stalled by the 1740s. Unlike Nabeshima ware, Hirado went on to be a significant exporter in the 19th century.
 
During the 17th century, in Kyoto, then Japan's imperial capital, kilns produced only clear lead-glazed pottery that resembled the pottery of southern China. Among them, potter Nonomura Ninsei invented an opaque overglaze enamel and with temple patronage was able to refine many Japanese-style designs. His disciple Ogata Kenzan invented an idiosyncratic arts-and-crafts style and took  (Kyoto ceramics) to new heights. Their works were the models for later .

In the late 18th to early 19th century, white porcelain clay was discovered in other areas of Japan and was traded domestically, and potters were allowed to move more freely. Local lords and merchants established many new kilns (e.g., Kameyama kiln and Tobe kiln) for economic profit, and old kilns such as Seto restarted as porcelain kilns. These many kilns are called "New Kilns" and they popularized porcelain in the style of the Arita kilns among the common folk.

Meiji period 

During the international openness of the Meiji period, Japanese arts and crafts had a new audience and set of influences. Traditional patrons such as the  class broke away and many of the artisans lost their source of income. The government took an active interest in the art export market, promoting Japanese arts at a succession of world's fairs, beginning with the 1873 Vienna World's Fair. The Imperial Household also took an active interest in arts and crafts, appointing Imperial Household Artists and commissioning works ("presentation wares") as gifts for foreign dignitaries. Most of the works promoted internationally were in the decorative arts, including pottery.

Satsuma ware was a name originally given to pottery from Satsuma province, elaborately decorated with overglaze enamels and gilding. These wares were highly praised in the West. Seen in the West as distinctively Japanese, this style actually owed a lot to imported pigments and Western influences, and had been created with export in mind. Workshops in many cities raced to produce this style to satisfy demand from Europe and America, often producing quickly and cheaply. So the term "Satsuma ware" came to be associated not with a place of origin but with lower-quality ware created purely for export. Despite this, there were artists such as Yabu Meizan and Makuzu Kōzan who maintained the highest artistic standards while also successfully exporting. These artists won multiple awards at international exhibitions. Meizan used copper plates to create detailed designs and repeatedly transfer them to the pottery, sometimes decorating a single object with a thousand motifs.

Japan's porcelain industry was well-established at the start of the Meiji period, but the mass-produced wares were not known for their elegance. During this era, technical and artistic innovations turned porcelain into one of the most internationally successful Japanese decorative art forms. A lot of this is due to Makuzu Kōzan, known for Satsuma ware, who from the 1880s onwards introduced new technical sophistication to the decoration of porcelain, while committed to preserving traditional artistic values. During the 1890s he developed a style of decoration that combined multiple underglaze colours on each item. The technical sophistication of his underglazes increased during this decade as he continued to experiment. In the decade from 1900 to 1910 there was a substantial change in the shape and decoration of his works, reflecting Western influences. His work strongly influenced Western perceptions of Japanese design.

Taishō period 
Japanese pottery strongly influenced British studio potter Bernard Leach (1887–1979), who is regarded as the "Father of British studio pottery". He lived in Japan from 1909 to 1920 during the Taishō period and became the leading western interpreter of Japanese pottery and in turn influenced a number of artists abroad.

Shōwa period 

During the early Shōwa period, the folk art movement  developed, starting in the late 1920s and 1930s. Its founding father was Yanagi Sōetsu (1889–1961). He rescued lowly pots used by commoners in the Edo and Meiji period that were disappearing in rapidly urbanizing Japan. Shōji Hamada (1894–1978) was a potter who was a major figure of the  movement, establishing the town of Mashiko as a renowned centre for Mashiko ware. Another influential potter in this movement was Kawai Kanjirō (1890–1966) and Tatsuzō Shimaoka (1919–2007). These artists studied traditional glazing techniques to preserve native wares in danger of disappearing.

One of the most critical moments was during the Pacific War when all resources went towards the war efforts, and production and development became severely hampered and the markets suffered.

Heisei period to present 
A number of institutions came under the aegis of the Cultural Properties Protection Division.

The kilns at Tamba, overlooking Kobe, continued to produce the daily wares used in the Tokugawa period, while adding modern shapes. Most of the village wares were made anonymously by local potters for utilitarian purposes. Local styles, whether native or imported, tended to be continued without alteration into the present. In Kyūshū, kilns set up by Korean potters in the 16th century, such as at Koishiwara, Fukuoka and its offshoot at Onta ware, perpetuated 16th-century Korean peasant wares.

The modern potters operate in Shiga, Iga, Karatsu, Hagi, and Bizen. Yamamoto Masao (Toushuu) of Bizen and Miwa Kyusetsu of Hagi were designated . Only a half-dozen potters had been so honored by 1989, either as representatives of famous kiln wares or as creators of superlative techniques in glazing or decoration; two groups were designated for preserving the wares of distinguished ancient kilns.

In the old capital of Kyoto, the Raku family continued to produce the rough tea bowls that had so delighted Hideyoshi. At Mino, potters continued to reconstruct the classic formulas of Momoyama period Seto-type tea wares of Mino, such as the Oribe ware copper-green glaze and Shino ware's prized milky glaze. Ancient porcelain kilns around Arita in Kyūshū were still maintained by the lineage of Sakaida Kakiemon XIV and Imaizumi Imaemon XIII, hereditary porcelain makers to the Nabeshima clan; both were heads of groups designated .

British artist Lucie Rie (1902–1995) was influenced by Japanese pottery and Bernard Leach, and was also appreciated in Japan with a number of exhibitions. British artist Edmund de Waal (b. 1964) studied Leach and spent a number of years in Japan studying  style. Brother Thomas Bezanson from Canada was influenced by it.

In contrast, by the end of the 1980s, many master potters no longer worked at major or ancient kilns but were making classic wares in various parts of Japan. In Tokyo, a notable example is Tsuji Seimei, who brought his clay from Shiga but potted in the Tokyo area. A number of artists were engaged in reconstructing Chinese styles of decoration or glazes, especially the blue-green celadon and the watery-green . One of the most beloved Chinese glazes in Japan is the chocolate-brown  glaze that covered the peasant tea bowls brought back from southern Song China (in the twelfth and thirteenth centuries) by Zen monks. In the United States, a notable example of the use of  glazes may be found in the innovative crystalline pots thrown by Japanese-born artist Hideaki Miyamura.

Clay
Clay is chosen largely based on local materials available.  There is an abundance of most basic types of clay in Japan. Due to naturally occurring kaolin deposits, many porcelain clays are found in Kyushu. Kilns were traditionally built at the sites of clay deposits, and most potters still use local clays, having developed a range of glazes and decoration techniques especially suited to that clay. The pottery clays found in the Japanese archipelago range from fusible earthenwares to refractory kaolins. From the Jōmon period to the Yayoi period, Japanese potters relied on high plastic iron-bearing shale and alluvial clays. Organic materials appear in much of the early Jōmon period work, but sand or crushed stone predominates thereafter.

Further refinements came about under the Chinese influence in the 8th and 9th centuries AD, when creators of Nara three-color wares and Heian ash glazed wares sought out white, refractory clays and enhanced their fineness through levigation. In Kyoto, where demand makes it both practical and profitable, the clay is crushed, blunged (made into slip), and filtered commercially.

Before the clay is ready to be thrown, it must pass through the  process, which produces a bullet-shaped mass from which all air bubbles have been removed, and in which the granular structure is arranged so that it radiates outwards from the center of the mass.

Production methods 

The earliest pieces were made by pressing the clay into shape. This method continued to be employed after the invention of the wheel, such as when producing Rengetsu ware. Coiled methods developed in the Jōmon period. Production by kneading and cutting slabs developed later, for example, for  clay figures.

Potter's wheel
The first use of the potter's wheel in Japan can be seen in Sue pottery. While Sue productions combined wheel and coiling techniques, the lead-glazed earthenware made under Chinese influence from the 8th to the 10th centuries include forms made entirely on the potter's wheel.

The wheel head was a large, thick, circular piece of wood with shallow holes on the upper surface around the periphery of the disc. The potter kept the wheel in motion by inserting a wooden handle into one of the holes and revolving the wheel head on its shaft until the desired speed was reached.

The handwheel is always turned clockwise, and the weight of the large wheel head induces it, after starting, to revolve rapidly for a long period of time. Pieces made on the handwheel have a high degree of accuracy and symmetry because there is no movement of the potter's body while throwing, as is the case with the kick wheel. In the early days of porcelain making in Japan, the Kyoto, Seto, and Nagoya areas used only the handwheel; elsewhere, in the Kutani area and in Arita, the kick wheel was employed. Its design is similar in many respects to that of the handwheel, or it may have a wooden tip set in the top, and an iron pipe, like later wheels. The kick wheel is always turned in a counterclockwise direction, and the inevitable motion of the potter's body as they kick the wheel while throwing gives many Japanese pots a casual lack of symmetry which appeals to contemporary Western tastes.

Following the Meiji Restoration in 1868, a student of Dr. Wagener went to Germany to learn how to build a downdraft kiln, and observed many wheels operated by belts on pulleys from a single shaft. On his return he set up a similar system in the Seto area, using one man to turn the flywheel that drove the shaft and the pulley system. From this beginning the two-man wheel developed.

Today, most potters in Kyoto use electric wheels, though there are many studios that still have a handwheel and a kick wheel. However, it is now difficult to find craftsmen who can make or repair them.

Coil and throw
At Koishibara, Onda, and Tamba, large bowls and jars are first roughly coil-built on the wheel, then shaped by throwing, in what is known as the "coil and throw technique". The preliminary steps are the same as for coil building, after which the rough form is lubricated with slip and shaped between the potter's hands as the wheel revolves. The process dates back 360 years to a Korean technique brought to Japan following Hideyoshi's invasion of Korea.

Tools 
Generally fashioned out of fast-growing bamboo or wood, these tools for shaping pottery have a natural feel that is highly appealing. While most are Japanese versions of familiar tools in the West, some are unique Japanese inventions.

  or "cows' tongues" are long sled-shaped bamboo ribs used to compress the bottoms and shape the sides of straight-sided bowls. They are a traditional tool from Arita, Kyushu.
  are round, shallow clam shell-shaped bamboo ribs used to shape the sides of curved bowls. They can also be used to compress the bottoms of thrown forms.
 , similar to wooden ribs, are leaf-shaped bamboo ribs used to shape and smooth the surfaces of a pot.
  are bamboo trimming and modeling "knives" available in several different shapes for carving, cleaning up wet pots, cutting, and for producing sgraffito effects.
 , "dragonflies", are the functional equivalent of Western calipers with an added feature.
  are wire and bamboo trimming harps that double as a fluting tool. They are used to cut off uneven or torn rims as well as to facet leather-hard forms.
 , "cranes' necks", are s-curved Japanese wooden throwing sticks used to shape the interiors of narrow-necked pieces such as bottles and certain vases.
  are cutting, carving and incising tools made of iron and used to trim pieces, for carving, sgraffito and for scraping off excess glaze.
 A  is a large looped ribbon tool made of iron that can be used for trimming as well as carving.
 An  is a trimming harp used to level flat, wide surfaces, such as the bottom of a shallow dish or plate.
  are not strictly throwing tools; these combs are used to score a minimum of two decorative parallel lines on pot surfaces. The largest combs have about 20 teeth.
 A  is also not a throwing tool, but a Japanese slip-trailer. A  is a high-capacity bamboo bottle with a spout from which slip and glaze can be poured out in a steady, controlled stream so the potter can "draw" with it.

Wares 
Hundreds of different wares and styles have existed throughout its history. The most historic and well-known ones have received recognition from the government. For more information see the list of Japanese ceramics sites.

Museums and collections 
A number of museums in Japan are dedicated entirely only to ceramics. Amongst the most well-known ones are the Aichi Prefectural Ceramic Museum close to Nagoya, the Arita Porcelain Park, the Fukuoka Oriental Ceramics Museum, the Kyushu Ceramic Museum, the Noritake Garden, the Museum of Oriental Ceramics, Osaka, the Okayama Prefectural Bizen Ceramics Museum, and the Ōtsuka Museum of Art. Public museums such as the Kyushu National Museum, Kyoto National Museum, Nara National Museum, Tokyo National Museum and Ishikawa Prefectural Museum of Art have important ceramic collections. A number of private museums also have important items such as the MOA Museum of Art, Mitsui Memorial Museum, Seikadō Bunko Art Museum, Fujita Art Museum and Kubosō Memorial Museum of Arts, Izumi. A number of important ceramic items are also owned and kept in various temples in Japan such as the Ryūkō-in, Kohō-an and Shōkoku-ji, however the items are not exhibited publicly.

Most ceramic museums around the world have collections of Japanese pottery, many very extensive.  Japanese modern ceramic works are often very sought-after and expensive. Apart from traditional styles art and studio pottery in contemporary art styles are made for the international market.

See also
 Japanese craft
 Japanese art
 Chinese ceramics
 Korean pottery and porcelain
 
 List of National Treasures of Japan (crafts: others)

References

Citations

Bibliography
Smith, Lawrence, Harris, Victor and Clark, Timothy, Japanese Art: Masterpieces in the British Museum, 1990, British Museum Publications, 
Henry Trubner, "Japanese Ceramics: A Brief History", in Ceramic Art of Japan, Seattle, USA, Seattle Art Museum,1972, Library ofCongress Catalogue No.74-189738
Tsuneko S. Sadao and Stephanie Wada, Discovering the Arts of Japan: A Historical Overview, Tokyo-New York-London, KODANSYA INTERNATIONAL, 2003, 
Ford, Barbara Brennan, and Oliver R. Impey, Japanese Art from the Gerry Collection in The Metropolitan Museum of Art, 1989, Metropolitan Museum of Art
Watson, William ed., The Great Japan Exhibition: Art of the Edo Period 1600–1868, 1981, Royal Academy of Arts/Weidenfeld & Nicolson
Sanders, Herbert Hong. The World of Japanese Ceramics. Kodansha International LTD, 1967.
Simpson, Penny. The Japanese Pottery Handbook. New York and San Francisco: Kodansha International LTD, 1979.
Turner, Jane. "Japan: Ceramics". Dictionary of Art: Jansen to Ketel. 1996. 240+.
Yap, Jennifer. "Wheel Throwing Tools: Japanese: Descriptions & Explanations – Traditional Japanese Clay Tools". Pottery @ Suite101.com. 30 Apr. 2007. 1 May 2009
"YouTube - Takiguchi Kiheiji, The Oribe master". YouTube. 1 May 2009

Further reading

Simpson, Penny. The Japanese Pottery Handbook. New York and San Francisco: Kodansha International LTD, 1979.
Turner, Jane. "Japan: Ceramics". Dictionary of Art: Jansen to Ketel. 1996. 240+.
Sanders, Herbert Hong. The World of Japanese Ceramics. Kodansha International LTD, 1967.
Yap, Jennifer. "Wheel Throwing Tools: Japanese: Descriptions & Explanations – Traditional Japanese Clay Tools". Pottery @ Suite101.com. 30 Apr. 2007. 1 May 2009
"Takiguchi Kiheiji, The Oribe master". YouTube. 1 May 2009 <https://www.youtube.com/watch?v=wXQQl5RH6jc>.

External links

 Japanese Pottery Information Center

 
Japanese porcelain